The Bromley-Mills-Treece House is a historic house on Main Street in Marshall, Arkansas.  It is a -story wood-frame structure, with a cross-gable configuration, clapboard siding, two interior brick chimneys, and a concrete foundation.  A single-story porch wraps around two sides of the house, supported by columns on stone piers, with decorative latticework between the bays.  Built in 1905, the house is a good example of a well-preserved vernacular structure with minimal Colonial Revival styling (in this case, the porch).

The house was listed on the National Register of Historic Places in 1993.

See also
National Register of Historic Places listings in Searcy County, Arkansas

References

Houses on the National Register of Historic Places in Arkansas
Colonial Revival architecture in Arkansas
Houses in Searcy County, Arkansas
National Register of Historic Places in Searcy County, Arkansas